The Bani Yas International Tournament is a yearly football tournament that takes place in Abu Dhabi in the United Arab Emirates that began in 2010.

The champion of the 2013 edition was Al-Nassr.

Participant teams

Fixtures

Third-place match

Final

Champion

See also
Bani Yas International Tournament

External links
goalzz.com

2013 in Asian football
Emirati football friendly trophies
Aln